Franz Heinzer (born April 11, 1962 in Rickenbach, Schwyz, Switzerland) is a former alpine ski racer, who specialized in downhill. He was World Cup champion in downhill three consecutive seasons (1991, 1992, 1993), second only to Franz Klammer (4 consecutive). He won a total of 15 World Cup downhill races, fourth behind Klammer (25), Peter Müller (19) and Stephan Eberharter (18). Together with Franz Klammer, Toni Sailer, Jean Claude Killy, Karl Schranz and Stephan Eberharter, he is considered among the best downhill racers of all time.  He also won the season title in Super-G in 1991.

Career
Heinzer won at the world's most famous downhill venues: Kitzbühel (3x), Wengen, Val Gardena (2x), Garmisch, Val-d'Isère, Aspen, Lake Louise, and St. Anton. His victory in the downhill event at the 1991 World Championships came after three fourth places at previous championships (Schladming (1982), Bormio (1985) and Crans-Montana (1987). He didn't compete in the downhill at Vail in 1989. At the 1994 Winter Olympics in Norway, his right binding released at the starting gate, putting him out of the downhill race.

A month later, Heinzer retired from international competition at age 31 with 17 World Cup victories and 45 podiums. He now runs his own sports products company in Altdorf, and since the winter of 2004, also works as the assistant coach of Swiss national downhill team.

The Franz Heinzer Piste in the Swiss ski resort of Stoos, a FIS-approved downhill run on the Klingenstock,
is named in his honour.

World Cup results

Season standings

Season titles
4 season titles: 3 downhill, 1 super G

Individual races
17 race victories: 15 downhill, 2 combined

References

External links
 
 

Swiss male alpine skiers
Olympic alpine skiers of Switzerland
Alpine skiers at the 1988 Winter Olympics
Alpine skiers at the 1992 Winter Olympics
Alpine skiers at the 1994 Winter Olympics
1962 births
Living people
FIS Alpine Ski World Cup champions
Sportspeople from the canton of Schwyz
20th-century Swiss people